Ballville is a census-designated place (CDP) in Sandusky County, Ohio, United States, adjacent to Fremont. The population was 3,255 at the 2000 census.

History
Ballville was laid out around 1840. The community was named after Colonel Ball, a local Indian fighter.

Geography

Demographics

As of the census of 2000, there were 3,255 people, 1,332 households, and 1,008 families residing in the CDP. The population density was 1,187.0 people per square mile (458.7/km2). There were 1,375 housing units at an average density of 501.4/sq mi (193.8/km2). The racial makeup of the CDP was 94.81% White, 1.26% African American, 0.06% Native American, 0.74% Asian, 1.90% from other races, and 1.23% from two or more races. Hispanic or Latino of any race were 3.69% of the population.

There were 1,332 households, out of which 27.9% had children under the age of 18 living with them, 65.0% were married couples living together, 7.6% had a female householder with no husband present, and 24.3% were non-families. 21.7% of all households were made up of individuals, and 11.4% had someone living alone who was 65 years of age or older. The average household size was 2.42 and the average family size was 2.80.

In the CDP the population was spread out, with 21.8% under the age of 18, 5.7% from 18 to 24, 23.3% from 25 to 44, 29.0% from 45 to 64, and 20.2% who were 65 years of age or older. The median age was 45 years. For every 100 females there were 91.1 males. For every 100 females age 18 and over, there were 86.7 males.

The median income for a household in the CDP was $49,261, and the median income for a family was $59,063. Males had a median income of $45,547 versus $31,532 for females. The per capita income for the CDP was $29,272. About 4.6% of families and 5.1% of the population were below the poverty line, including 8.6% of those under age 18 and 3.5% of those age 65 or over.

References

Census-designated places in Sandusky County, Ohio